This is a list of winners and nominations for the Tony Award for Best Lighting Design in a Play for outstanding Lighting design of a play. The award was first presented in 2005 after the category of Best Lighting Design was divided into Lighting Design in a Play and Lighting Design in a Musical with each genre receiving its own award.

Winners and nominees

2000s

2010s

2020s

Award records

Multiple wins
 3 Wins
 Neil Austin
 Brian MacDevitt
 Natasha Katz

 2 Wins

 Paule Constable

Multiple nominations

 6 Nominations
 Brian MacDevitt
 Paule Constable

 5 Nominations
 Donald Holder

 4 Nominations
 Neil Austin
 Natasha Katz

 3 Nominations
 Jane Cox
 Peggy Eisenhauer
 Jules Fisher
 Mark Henderson
 Kenneth Posner
 Jennifer Tipton
 Japhy Weideman
 Jan Versweyveld

 2 Nominations
 Christopher Akerlind
 Jiyoun Chang
 Jon Clark
 David Lander
 Hugh Vanstone

See also
 Tony Award for Best Lighting Design in a Musical
 Drama Desk Award for Outstanding Lighting Design
 Laurence Olivier Award for Best Lighting Design

External links
Tony Awards Official site
Tony Awards at Internet Broadway database Listing
Tony Awards at broadwayworld.com

Tony Awards
Awards established in 2005
2005 establishments in New York City